Hillah ( al-Ḥillah), also spelled Hilla, is a city in central Iraq on the Hilla branch of the Euphrates River,  south of Baghdad. The population is estimated at 364,700 in 1998. It is the capital of Babylon Province and is located adjacent to the ancient city of Babylon, and close to the ancient cities of Borsippa and Kish. It is situated in a predominantly agricultural region which is extensively irrigated with water provided by the Hilla canal, producing a wide range of crops, fruit and textiles. Its name may be derived from the word "beauty" in Arabic. The river runs exactly in the middle of the town, and it is surrounded by date palm trees and other forms of arid vegetation, reducing the harmful effects of dust and desert wind.

The city was once a major center of Islamic scholarship and education. The tomb of the Jewish prophet Ezekiel is reputed to be located in a nearby village, Al Kifl.

It became a major administrative centre during the rule of the Ottoman and British Empires. In the 19th century, the Hilla branch of the Euphrates started to silt up and much agricultural land was lost to drought, but this process was reversed by the construction of the Hindiya Barrage in 1911–1913, which diverted water from the deeper Hindiya branch of the Euphrates into the Hilla canal. It saw heavy fighting in 1920 during an uprising against the British, when 300 men of the Manchester Regiment were apparently defeated in the city.

History

Babylon

Hillah is located near the ruins of ancient Babylon. It is likely that Babylon was founded in the third millennium BC and rose to prominence over the next thousand years. By the 18th century BC the city was the centre of the empire of Hammurabi. Various empires controlled Babylon over the following centuries. Babylon briefly regained independence during the Neo-Babylonian empire towards the end of the 7th century BC, most notably under the reign of king Nebuchadnezzar II, but came under brief Persian occupation in the 6th century BC.

The ruins of Babylon have suffered greatly due to looting and destructive policies. Parts of Nebuchadnezzar's palace and some of the old city walls still remain. Saddam Hussein commissioned a restoration of ancient Babylon on part of the site. A modern palace was restored on Nebuchadnezzar ancient palace. A reconstruction of the Ishtar Gate is displayed in the Pergamon Museum in Berlin.

Birth of Hillah

In the 10th century, the town of Al Jami'ayn was founded on the eastern bank of the Euphrates. The location of that town is in modern-day Hillah now. In 1101 AD a new town was founded near Al Jami'ayn. Bricks were taken from Babylon to build houses and so Hillah expanded. During the 18th century, the town became an administrative center in the Ottoman Empire. In the 19th century, the flow in the al-Hillah stream decreased, and that led to worsening conditions for agriculture, which affected them greatly. To solve the problem, al-Hindiya Barrage was built.

2003 US invasion
Hillah was the scene of relatively heavy fighting in the 2003 invasion of Iraq on and around April 1, 2003. Iraqi casualties from the Medina Division of the Republican Guard were unknown but casualties reached in the several hundreds for the United States Army's 2-70th Armor. The Iraqi republican guard repulsed the attacks and the US marines never managed to establish control over the area. 

Shortly after the invasion a mass grave site was reported by locals to be in the area around Hillah. Local citizens and members of ORHA, and NMCB-15 (Naval Mobile Construction Battalion) worked together to exhume thousands of Iraqis who had been killed by Iraq's security forces during the uprising against the government in 1991.

The 1st Marine Division had established a base at one of Saddam Hussein's palaces about one mile north of Hillah. The 372nd Military Police Company had performed law and order and Iraqi Police training in the city from June 2003 to October 2003 prior to moving on to Abu Ghraib prison. The city was part of the Polish military zone during the occupation of Iraq.

After the initial invasion, Hilla was relatively peaceful, but it then became the scene of numerous bomb attacks.
 In February, 2004, insurgents tried but failed to blow up a camp run by Hungarian troops with truck bombs.
 February 28, 2005 saw the deadliest single insurgent attack up till then, when a car bomb killed 125 people outside a medical clinic.
 On May 30, 2005, two suicide bombers killed 31, and wounded 108, Shia police.
 On September 30, 2005, a car bomb exploded in a vegetable market in Hilla, killing 10 and wounding 30 others.
On January 2, 2007, at least 73 people were killed and more than 160 were injured when two suicide bombers blew up themselves at a gathering of Shia militias.
On February 1, 2007, a pair of suicide bombers detonated explosives among shoppers at a crowded outdoor market, killing at least 45 people and wounding approximately 150.
 On March 6, 2007, 114 people were killed and at least 147 people were wounded in two car bomb attacks targeting Shia pilgrims.
On May 10, 2010, a series of three to four suicide car bombs at the 'State Company for Textile Industries' in the city killed a total of 45 people and left 140 wounded.
On March 6, 2016, a truck bomb hit a military checkpoint in Hillah, killing at least 60 people and wounding more than 70. The Islamic State of Iraq and the Levant (ISIL) claimed responsibility for the bombing.

Climate
Hillah has a hot desert climate (BWh) in the Köppen–Geiger climate classification system. Most rain falls in the winter. About  of precipitation falls annually.

Geology and natural resources

A detailed scientific study at the University of Babylon proved that Babil province is rich with natural untapped oil, gas and minerals of economic and industrial rocks and sediments of rivers and groundwater that can be exploited to intensify studies, geophysical surveys and mining.

Health

Babil governorate has ten hospitals with 1,200 beds. At the beginning of 2005, the local health department announced some plans to build two hospitals with 50 beds each near Al-Khifil and Al-Shomaly. Major hospitals in Hillah, will also receive major renovations. Staff master plan is to raise the level of training of personnel in the field of nursing and re-construction of new health centers across the province.

Hillah contains four major government hospitals and they are: Hillah General Teaching Hospital, Babylon Hospital for Women and Children, Merjan Teaching Hospital, and Al Noor Hospital for Children.

Since 2008, Hillah has hosted an annual medical conference under the slogan "Babylon .. cultural capital of Iraq .. the future of medicine in scientific research". The conference offers a number of scientific presentations that address the medical health and education in the country and projects to support health and medical research in the future.  There is also an exhibition of modern medical devices and electric vehicles for people with disabilities, in addition to medicines and treatments.

Culture

Hillah has a rich cultural history and widely published in history books, literature, geography, and biographies. The single most famous medieval Shia theologian, Allamah Jamāl ad-Dīn Hasan al-Hilli is a native son.  It was chosen as the cultural capital of Iraq in 2008 because of its large cultural gatherings and art galleries, as well as the many talents in all fields of culture and art, particularly poetry, writing, music and vocals.

And many well known Iraqi writers have written about it, including: Mr. Abdul-Razzaq al-Husseini, Abd al-Qadir al-Zahawi, Mohammad Mehdi Aljawahiri, Rusafi, Sahtia AlHasri, Dr. Fadel Aljamali, Thi Alnun Ayoub, Dr Ali Jawad Tahir, and Ahmad al-Safi al-Najafi.

Many writers, poets, and artists have also come from Hillah, including: Sharif Alrhdi, Dheyaa Hamio, Saifuddin Al-Hilly, Mohammed Mahdi Albasir, Ali Jawad Tahir, archaeologist Ahmed Sosa, Taha Baqer, and Ahmed Saeed.

Jamāl ad-Dīn Hasan ibn Yusuf ibn 'Ali ibn-i Mûtahhar[1] al-Hilli (Arabic: جمال الدين الحسن بن يوسف الحلي), also known as al-Allamah al-Hilli (Arabic: العلامة الحلي, "the sage from Hilla"),[2] born December 15, 1250 CE (19 Ramadan 648 AH), died December 18, 1325, was a Twelver Shia theologian and mujtahid. Known as a Marja' (Grand Ayatollah), he was one of the well known Shia scholars of his time. His full name is Jamal al-Din Abu Mansur Hasan ibn Yusuf ibn Mutahhar al-Hilli. We know of at least one hundred books written by him, some of which are still in the form of manuscripts. Muhammad bin Al-Hassan al Hurr Al- Amili in his work Amal al Amil, p. 40, enumerated no less than 67 works of this learned author.

Education

The Ottomans established modern schools, including the school Al-Rashidiya where material was taught in Turkish. The first elementary school in Hillah was Madrasat Al-Sharqia, which was founded in 1918 with one class and twenty students.  It was located in the top floor of the Grand Mosque and the first director of it was Mr. Abdul Mahdi al-Hilali. Later the school moved to a building on the Shatt al-Hilla with four classes, but this school was not stable because the majority of students leave these schools to study at the seminary. The first secondary school in Hillah, established in 1927, was Al-Hillah Secondary School. Another school was Moderiat Alm'arif, founded in year 1931.

University education in Hillah started with the founding of the Institute of Management in 1976 and the foundation of the Department of Technology and Management Branch Stores. In 1980 it was called the Technical Institute; today it is called the Technical Institute in Babylon and includes the following fields: scientific (civil and space and electrical and electronic devices, computers and mechanics, machinery and equipment), administrative (accounting, management, and computer systems), and medical (community health and nursing). In 1959 the Technical Institute established a project Musayyib that included these disciplines: technological (Irrigation and mechanics, machinery and equipment), administrative (accounting, warehouse management), and agricultural (plant production, soil and land reclamation, machinery and agricultural equipment, and production of life). Starting in 1991, the University of Babylon offers education in fine arts, law, engineering, science, education, medicine, management, economy, literature, agriculture, science for girls dentistry, veterinary medicine, and nursing. The university includes several scientific centers: Center for Studies Babylonian Center, documents and studies Hillah, electronic calculators, Teaching Methods Development Center, and Continuing Education Center. The province of Babylon contains five universities: Babylon University, Alqasim Green University (introduced in 2012 in Al-Qasim), Al-Nahrain University, Almostaqbal University College, and Hillah University College.

Archaeological sites

Babylon ruins

Located just 5 km (3.1 mi) north of the city of Hillah, Babylon was a marveled city of the ancient world, especially under the rule of king Nebuchadnezzar (605–562 BC). It was the capital of the Neo-Babylonian Empire and its walls and hanging gardens were considered one of the seven wonders of the world.

Kish ruins (Tel Alahamr)
Kish is located 13 km (8 mi) from city of Hillah and 6 km (3.7 mi) east of the ancient city of Babylon. The ruins including the ziggurat "Inner Cdermh", a ziggurat structure of "Baba deer", god of war.

Alberes
Alberes is situated south of Hillah, approximately 24 km (14.9 mi) away.  It has a tower found between Hillah and Al-Khifil. Its current name is a distortion of the name Old Babylonian "بورسيا" (which is now a newspaper) and its Sumerian meaning is "sword of the sea", because it was located on the Ghadeer edge along the banks of the Sea of Najaf.

See also
 List of places in Iraq

References

External links

 Iraq Image - Al Hillah Satellite Observation

 
Cities in Iraq
Populated places in Babil Governorate
Populated places on the Euphrates River
Holy cities
District capitals of Iraq